Flambeau River  is a waterway on the Seward Peninsula in the U.S. state of Alaska. It has a broad, basin-shaped valley, and terminates as a tributary to Safety Sound. Its name is first recorded by Edward Chester Barnard of the United States Geological Survey (1900). The nearby gold prospect deposit site, "Flambeau River", is named after the waterway.

References

Rivers of Nome Census Area, Alaska
Rivers of the Seward Peninsula
Rivers of Alaska
Rivers of Unorganized Borough, Alaska